Hassenplug Bridge is a historic wooden covered bridge at Mifflinburg, Union County, Pennsylvania. The 2021 reconstruction replaced the 1959 steel grate floor with historically authentic, wide, wood planks once again. It crosses the west or south branch of Buffalo Creek. Named for the Hassenplug family of the early 19th century who lived in the brick homestead located on the north side of the bridge. The Hassenplugs were locally well known for their production of german beer. 

It was listed on the National Register of Historic Places in 1980. It is the oldest covered bridge in Pennsylvania (the state with the most covered bridges), and is purportedly the oldest covered bridge in the United States. However, this distinction is also claimed for the Hyde Hall Bridge in New York.

References

Covered bridges on the National Register of Historic Places in Pennsylvania
Covered bridges in Union County, Pennsylvania
Bridges completed in 1825
Wooden bridges in Pennsylvania
Bridges in Union County, Pennsylvania
National Register of Historic Places in Union County, Pennsylvania
Road bridges on the National Register of Historic Places in Pennsylvania
Burr Truss bridges in the United States